Iván Espinosa de los Monteros y de Simón (born 3 January 1971) is a Spanish real estate developer and politician who serves as Member of the Congress of Deputies for the Madrid constituency.

As a prominent member of the Spanish national-conservative political party Vox, Espinosa serves as Spokesperson of the Vox Parliamentary Group in Congress. Within Vox, he is the Deputy Secretary for International Relations.

Biography 
Espinosa was born in the City of Madrid in 1971. He is one of the five sons of executive Carlos Espinosa de los Monteros y Bernaldo de Quirós, 4th Marquess of Valtierra, and his wife, María Eugenia de Simón y Vallarino. Espinosa studied Economic and Business Sciences at the Catholic Institute of Business Administration and Management and got an MBA at the Kellogg School of Management.

In 2001 he married Rocío Monasterio, a Spanish-Cuban architect, with whom he has four children. The couple has sometimes worked together in the construction sector, buying unused spaces to convert them into luxury homes designed by Monasterio. He has held senior positions in several international financial groups such as Arthur Andersen, Schroders or McKinsey. He himself owns several companies in the luxury housing and restaurant sector.

He speaks Spanish, Catalan, English and French.

Political career 
Linked to the political party Vox since its foundation in 2013, he held the position of General Secretary of the Provisional Organizing Committee before the celebration of the first party congress. In that congress, he was elected Secretary-General of the party until October 2016 when he assumed as Deputy Secretary for International Relations. He was part of the electoral list of Vox in the 2014 European election in Spain, led by former First Vice President of the European Parliament Vidal-Quadras. Vox did not obtain representation.

A noted orator, Espinosa has represented his party in various political gatherings on television. Likewise, he has manifested himself in favor of the unity of Spain and the monarchy and has stated that he has been a voter of the People's Party, a formation to which he is currently critical. Espinosa has criticized the 2004 Gender Violence Act on several occasions and he has also manifested himself in favor of the criminalisation of parties not believing in the "unity of Spain" and of those that "do not renege on Marxism."

For the 2019 general election, Espinosa was chosen to occupy the third place in the electoral list of Vox to the Congress of Deputies. On 28 April, he was elected MP for Madrid. On 21 May he was appointed Spokesperson of the Vox Parliamentary Group in the Congress.

Legal cases 
In April 2019, the digital newspaper eldiario.es reported that a court in Madrid had sentenced a company, of which Espinosa was  the only shareholder and administrator, to pay part of a debt it had contracted with a construction company that he had hired to carry out some works in a house in Madrid and on which there were discrepancies. Espinosa had paid part of the necessary repairs whose amount the court deducted from the amount claimed. The sentence was ratified by the Provincial Court of Madrid.

In November 2019, Espinosa said on Antena 3's Espejo Público programme that per capita, immigrants are three times more likely to commit rape than Spaniards. The lawyer Hilal Tarkou initiated legal action, but in December 2020 a judge closed the case because he found that no crime was committed.

References 

1971 births
Kellogg School of Management alumni
Living people
Politicians from the Community of Madrid
Spanish nationalists
Male critics of feminism
Critics of multiculturalism
Members of the 13th Congress of Deputies (Spain)
Spanish economists
Vox (political party) politicians
Members of the 14th Congress of Deputies (Spain)